I is a vowel of Indic abugidas. In modern Indic scripts, I is derived from the early "Ashoka" Brahmi letter  after having gone through the Gupta letter . As an Indic vowel, "I" comes in two normally distinct forms: 1) as an independent letter, and 2) as a vowel sign for modifying a base consonant. Bare consonants without a modifying vowel sign have the inherent "A" vowel.

Āryabhaṭa numeration

Aryabhata used Devanagari letters for numbers, very similar to the Greek numerals, even after the invention of Indian numerals. The "I" sign was used to modify a consonant's value , but the independent vowel letter did not have an inherent value by itself.

Historic I
There are three different general early historic scripts - Brahmi and its variants, Kharoṣṭhī, and Tocharian, the so-called slanting Brahmi. I as found in standard Brahmi,  was a simple geometric shape, with variations toward more flowing forms by the Gupta . Like all Brahmic scripts, Tocharian I  has an accompanying vowel mark for modifying a base consonant. In Kharoṣṭhī, the only independent vowel letter is for the inherent A. All other independent vowels, including I are indicated with vowel marks added to the letter A.

Brahmi I
The Brahmi letter , I, is probably derived from the altered Aramaic Ayin , and is thus related to the modern Latin O and Greek Omicron. Several identifiable styles of writing the Brahmi I can be found, most associated with a specific set of inscriptions from an artifact or diverse records from an historic period. As the earliest and most geometric style of Brahmi, the letters found on the Edicts of Ashoka and other records from around that time are normally the reference form for Brahmi letters, with vowel marks not attested until later forms of Brahmi back-formed to match the geometric writing style.

Tocharian I
The Tocharian letter  is derived from the Brahmi . Unlike some of the consonants, Tocharian vowels do not have a Fremdzeichen form.

Kharoṣṭhī I
The Kharoṣṭhī letter I is indicated with the vowel mark . As an independent vowel, I is indicated by adding the vowel marks to the independent vowel letter A .

Devanagari I

I (इ) is a vowel of the Devanagari abugida. It ultimately arose from the Brahmi letter , after having gone through the Gupta letter . Letters that derive from it are the Gujarati letter ઇ, and the Modi letter 𑘂.

Devanagari Using Languages
The Devanagari script is used to write the Hindi language, Sanskrit and the majority of  Indo-Aryan languages. Like all Indic scripts, Devanagari vowels come in two forms: an independent vowel form for syllables that begin with a vowel sound, and a vowel sign attached to base consonant to override the inherent /ə/ vowel.

Bengali I

I (ই) is a vowel of the Bengali abugida. It is derived from the Siddhaṃ letter , and is marked by a similar horizontal head line, but less geometric shape, than its Devanagari counterpart, इ.

Bengali Script Using Languages
The Bengali script is used to write several languages of eastern India, notably the Bengali language and Assamese. Like all Indic scripts, Bengali vowels come in two forms: an independent vowel form for syllables that begin with a vowel sound, and a vowel sign attached to base consonant to override the inherent /ɔ/ vowel.

Gujarati I

I (ઇ) is a vowel of the Gujarati abugida. It is derived from the Devanagari I , and ultimately the Brahmi letter .

Gujarati-using Languages
The Gujarati script is used to write the Gujarati and Kutchi languages. Like all Indic scripts, Gujarati vowels come in two forms: an independent vowel form for syllables that begin with a vowel sound, and a vowel sign attached to base consonant to override the inherent /ə/ vowel.

Javanese I

Telugu I

I (ఇ) is a vowel of the Telugu abugida. It ultimately arose from the Brahmi letter . It is closely related to the Kannada letter ಇ. Like in other Indic scripts, Telugu vowels have two forms: and independent letter for word and syllable-initial vowel sounds, and a vowel sign for changing the inherent "a" of Telugu consonant letters. Vowel signs in Telugu can interact with a base consonant in one of three ways: 1) the vowel sign touches or sits adjacent to the base consonant without modifying the shape of either 2) the vowel sign sits directly above the consonant, replacing its v-shaped headline, 3) the vowel sign and consonant interact, forming a ligature.

Malayalam I

I (ഇ) is a vowel of the Malayalam abugida. It ultimately arose from the Brahmi letter , via the Grantha letter  i. Like in other Indic scripts, Malayalam vowels have two forms: an independent letter for word and syllable-initial vowel sounds, and a vowel sign for changing the inherent "a" of consonant letters. Vowel signs in Malayalam usually sit adjacent to its base consonant - below, to the left, right, or both left and right, but are always pronounced after the consonant sound.

Odia I

I (ଇ) is a vowel of the Odia abugida. It ultimately arose from the Brahmi letter , via the Siddhaṃ letter  i. Like in other Indic scripts, Odia vowels have two forms: an independent letter for word and syllable-initial vowel sounds, and a vowel sign for changing the inherent "a" of consonant letters. Vowel signs in Odia usually sit adjacent to its base consonant - below, to the left, right, or both left and right, but are always pronounced after the consonant sound. No base consonants are altered in form when adding a vowel sign, and there are no consonant+vowel ligatures in Odia. Unlike other vowels, ଇ has an alternate subjoined matra form used on letters with an open top - ଖ (Kha), ଥ (Tha) and ଧ (Dha).

Comparison of I
The various Indic scripts are generally related to each other through adaptation and borrowing, and as such the glyphs for cognate letters, including I, are related as well.

Character encodings of I
Most Indic scripts are encoded in the Unicode Standard, and as such the letter I in those scripts can be represented in plain text with unique codepoint. I from several modern-use scripts can also be found in legacy encodings, such as ISCII.

References

Indic letters